Zhang Yousong (1903 – 1995) was a Chinese translator. He is a translator in China who translated the works of Mark Twain's into Chinese language.

Biography
Zhang was born in Liling, Hunan in 1903. At the age of 12, Zhang moved to Beijing with his sister.  Zhang is a graduate of Peking University. After graduation, he taught in Qingdao, Jinan, Changsha, and Hengyang. Zhang made the acquaintance of Lu Xun when he worked in Beixin Book Company. During the Second Sino-Japanese War (1937-1945), Zhang founded the Chenguang Book Company and Chunchao Book Company.

In 1951, after the founding of the PRC, Zhang returned to Beijing, then he worked in the People's Literature Publishing House.

In 1966, the Cultural Revolution was launched by Mao Zedong, Zhang suffered political persecution and experienced mistreatment, Red Guards of the Cultural Revolution attacked him as a counter-revolutionary, they struck him, and he was blinded in his right eye.

In 1984, Zhang settled in Chengdu, Sichuan. In his later years, he had been worn down by poverty and illness, he died in 1995.

Personal life
Zhang had one son and one daughter, his son died at an early age.

Works

Translations
 Immensee (Theodor Storm)
 Adventures of Huckleberry Finn
 The Adventures of Tom Sawyer
 Treasure Island (Robert Louis Stevenson)

References

1903 births
1995 deaths
People from Liling
National University of Peking alumni
People's Republic of China translators
20th-century Chinese translators